The Most Select Order of Sultan Mizan Zainal Abidin of Terengganu (Bahasa Melayu: Darjah Kebesaran Sultan Mizan Zainal Abidin Terengganu Yang Amat Terpilih) is an honorific order of the Sultanate of Terengganu

History 
It was founded by Sultan Mizan Zainal Abidin of Terengganu on 6 July 2001.

Classes 
It is awarded in a supreme class: 
 Sri Utama (established 26 May 2005) - S.U.M.Z.
and four ordinary classes :
 Knight Grand Companion or Dato' Sri Setia - S.S.M.Z.
 Knight Companion or Dato' Setia - D.S.M.Z.
 Companion or Setia - S.M.Z.
 Member or Ahli - A.M.Z.

Recipients

 Mizan Zainal Abidin of Terengganu

References 

Terengganu, Order of Sultan Mizan Zainal Abidin
Sultan Mizan Zainal Abidin